Buck and ball was a common load for muzzle-loading muskets, and was frequently used in the American Revolutionary War and into the early days of the American Civil War. The load usually consisted of a .50 to .75 caliber round lead musket ball that was combined with three to six buckshot pellets.

Construction 

By the 1840s, buck and ball was issued in prepared paper cartridges that combined the projectiles with the black powder propellant charge to facilitate rapid loading of the weapon. Like any other paper cartridge, the rear of the cartridge would be torn open to expose the powder, which would be loaded, and the remaining paper, ball, and buckshot would be rammed down on top.

Purpose 

The intent of the buck and ball load was to combine the devastating impact of a .50 to .75 caliber ball with the spreading pattern of a shotgun. The combination served to greatly improve the hit probability of the smoothbore musket. In combat, especially at closer ranges, the buckshot would retain significant energy. When used against closely packed troops, the spread of the buckshot would be advantageous.

Claud E. Fuller, in his book The Rifled Musket, shows tests of a rifled musket firing Minié ball, and a smoothbore musket firing round ball and buck rounds at various ranges against a  target. The firers consisted of several men in line shooting in volley. At , 50 shots by smoothbore buck and ball against the 10 x 10 target result in 79 buckshot hits and 37 ball strikes, as opposed to 48 Minié ball hits in 50 shots. At 200 yards, 37 of 50 Minié bullets struck the target, vs. 18 of 50 smoothbore balls and 31 of 50 buckshot, for a total of 49 hits in 50 shots.

Beyond this range, the buckshot will have lost too much energy to be effective due to its lower ballistic coefficient.

Use 
During the American Revolution, George Washington encouraged his troops to load their muskets with buck and ball loads.

The buck and ball load was standard issue throughout the Seminole Wars of 1815–45.

With the advent of general issue rifled muskets in the American Civil War, and longer engagement ranges during the later stages of the war, the buck and ball loading began to fade from use. Buck and ball did see action in the remaining inventory of smoothbore muskets at Gettysburg and later actions. The Union Irish Brigade retained their smoothbore muskets until late so they could fire buck and ball during the relatively close range battles. The 12th New Jersey Infantry Regiment also preferred to use buck and ball, which they did to deadly effect at Gettysburg, and so continued carrying smoothbore muskets.

For the modern combat shotgun the buck and ball load has been replaced in current military inventories by standard buckshot loadings.

Modern resurgence
Modern ammunition manufacturers have recently re-discovered Buck and Ball type shotgun loads, and have been manufacturing defensive shotgun ammunition which largely duplicates the properties of the historical loads. As an example Winchester's PDX1 12 gauge load features three 00-buck copper plated pellets over a one-ounce slug. Similar ammunition is produced by Centurion, called "Multi Defense Buckshot."

See also 
 Minié ball
 Muzzleloader

References

Further reading 
 The Rifle-Musket vs. The Smoothbore Musket, a Comparison of the Effectiveness of the Two Types of Weapons Primarily at Short Ranges
 Ordnance manual for the use of the officers of the United States army (1862), page 270

External links

Ammunition
American Civil War weapons